Omar Abdul Vahab, professionally credited as Omar Lulu, is an Indian film director who works in Malayalam cinema. He made his directorial debut in 2016 with Happy Wedding.

Career
His debut film Happy Wedding starring Sharafudheen, Soubin Shahir, Siju Wilson and  Justin John had a good run at the Kerala box-office and crossed 100 days run, it grossed  at the box office. His second film, Chunkzz, starring Honey Rose and Balu Varghese, released in August 2017 and was a commercial success at the box-office, which collected around 20 crore at the box office.

His third movie Oru Adaar Love was an international sensation which made Priya P Warrier an internet sensation by a wink scene from the film. It is also the first ever Malayalam film that got released in four different language (Malayalam, Telugu, Kannada and Tamil) simultaneously all around the world in more than 2000 theatres. The film made a box office hit for Omar and it is dubbed into Chinese, English, Arabic and all Indian languages. Dhamaka was his fourth movie released on theatres. In 2022, his fifth film titled Nalla Samayam released on theatres was withdrawn from the theaters three days after its release due to a case was filed against him by the Kozhikode Excise Inspector for promoting the use of the banned drug MDMA through the film. New movies in planning are Power Star starring Kannada actor Shreyas Manju, Babu Antony and freshers' LoveYathra.

Besides making films, Omar started directing musical albums by the year 2020. His last two albums, Tu Hi Hai Meri Zindagi and Jaana Meri Jaana starring Ajmal Khan and Jumana Khan was shot in Dubai in 2021.

Filmography

Music videos 

 Tu Hi Hai Meri Zindagi (2021)
Jaana Meri Jaana (2021)
Kaanan Thonnununde (2021)

Personal life

Controversy
In December 2022, Kerala Excise Department registered a case against makers of Nalla Samayam, movie directed by Omar Lulu for allegedly promoting the use of MDMA in movie's teaser. "Besides the substance, the trailer also had the scenes blindly promoting alcoholism and the makers of the movie did not even bother to show the statutory warning on the screen"; said officials.

References

External links
 
 
 

Film directors from Thrissur
Malayalam film directors
1984 births
Living people